Citizens State Bank or Citizen's State Bank may refer to:

Citizens State Bank (Gooding, Idaho), listed on the NRHP in Idaho
Citizens State Bank (Odenton, Maryland), listed on the NRHP in Maryland
Citizens State Bank (Edmond, Oklahoma), listed on the NRHP in Oklahoma
Citizen's State Bank (Marble City, Oklahoma), listed on the NRHP in Oklahoma
Citizens State Bank (Oklahoma City, Oklahoma), listed on the NRHP in Oklahoma
Citizens State Bank of Henry, Henry, SD, listed on the NRHP in South Dakota
Citizens State Bank of Gillett, Gillett, WI, listed on the NRHP in Wisconsin

See also 
Citizens Bank (disambiguation)